The nadir is a low or downward point of reference.

Nadir may also refer to:

 Nadir (horse) (1955–1978), an American Thoroughbred racehorse
 Nadir (name), a surname and given name
 Nadir (topography), a point of lowest local elevation
 Nadir (web portal), a German web portal
 Nadir, U.S. Virgin Islands, a settlement
 Nadirs (autobiography), by Herta Müller
 The Nadir, a fictional tribe in the novel Legend and other works by David Gemmell
 "Nadir", a song by Byzantine from Oblivion Beckons
 "Nadir", a song by Sadist from Above the Light
 Network Anomaly Detection and Intrusion Reporter, an intrusion detection system
 Nadir crater, a undersea feature on the Guinea Plateau in the Atlantic Ocean, named after the Nadir Seamount, located 100 km to the south

See also
 Nadir of American race relations, a term for the period from the end of Reconstruction to the 1920s